Tom Sullivan is a business news anchor for the Fox Business Network, who also hosts a syndicated radio talk show formerly on the Fox News Radio network.

Early career
A Seattle native, he moved to the San Francisco, California, area in the early 1970s and later was transferred to Sacramento, California, and now lives in the New York City area.
He spent four years as a Washington Highway Patrolman (1969-1973) before moving to Sacramento, Ca to pursue a career in the field of accounting.

Media work
Sullivan worked as financial editor for both KFBK and for KCRA-TV from 1980 to 2007. In 2007, Sullivan left Sacramento to host a show on the Fox Business Network.  His radio show became nationally syndicated by Fox News Radio.

References

External links
 TomSullivan.com – radio talk show
 FoxBusiness.com bio

American male journalists
American radio personalities
Fox Business people
Television anchors from Sacramento, California
Seattle University alumni
Living people
Year of birth missing (living people)